Sven Otto Nilsson (February 26, 1879 – November 10, 1960) was a Swedish athlete who competed in the 1908 Summer Olympics and in the 1912 Summer Olympics.

In 1908 he won the bronze medal in the javelin throw event. He also participated in the freestyle javelin throw competition and in the discus throw event but in both competitions his final ranking is unknown.

Four years later he finished eighth in the two handed javelin throw event, tenth in the javelin throw competition, and fortieth discus throw event.

References

External links
Official profile 

1879 births
1960 deaths
Swedish male javelin throwers
Swedish male discus throwers
Olympic athletes of Sweden
Athletes (track and field) at the 1908 Summer Olympics
Athletes (track and field) at the 1912 Summer Olympics
Olympic bronze medalists for Sweden
Medalists at the 1908 Summer Olympics
Olympic bronze medalists in athletics (track and field)